Lake Cumberland Regional Airport  is a public use airport located three nautical miles (6 km) south of the central business district of Somerset, a city in Pulaski County, Kentucky, United States. The airport is owned by the city of Somerset and Pulaski County. It also serves the area around Lake Cumberland.  It is mostly used for general aviation, and from late 2008 until February 2010, was served by one commercial airline, Locair. The $3 million federally funded  passenger terminal was converted to the FBO in September 2011. The Lake Cumberland Regional Airport is also home to Dicey Aviation, LLC, a full service flight training center that also offers scenic flights over the area. 

The airport was renamed in 2008; it was formerly known as Somerset-Pulaski County Airport or J.T. Wilson Field.

Facilities and aircraft
It has one asphalt paved runway designated 5/23 which measures 5,801 by 100 feet (1,768 x 30 m).

For the 12-month period ending August 31, 2008, the airport had 27,605 aircraft operations, an average of 75 per day: 99% general aviation and 1% military. At that time there were 28 aircraft based at this airport: 71% single-engine, 
14% multi-engine, 4% jet and 11% helicopter.

Airlines and destinations
Lake Cumberland Regional Airport currently does not have commercial service.

References

External links
 

Airports in Kentucky
Buildings and structures in Pulaski County, Kentucky
Transportation in Pulaski County, Kentucky